Tamara Yajia (born November 22, 1983) is an Argentinian-American comedian, writer, actress and musician.

She is best known for her Twitter persona, hailed by Playboy Magazine, Some Of The Loom, and Crave Magazine as "one of the funniest women on Twitter" and recently included in Paste Magazine's "75 Best Twitter Accounts".

As a writer, Yajia is a frequent contributor to ClickHole, and Funny Or Die. Her play, Cumming of Age, had a sold-out run at The Son Of Semele in Los Angeles in 2015.
Yajia is currently a permanent member of the writing staff at Funny or Die and has created several series for the network. She is best known for Funny or Die's "Me Llamo Alma", "Tam Gets Drunk And Watches..." as well as her celebrity interviews.

She is also a contributor at Merry Jane, Snoop Dogg's lifestyle website. 

Yajia is also a musician; she is a founding member of Los Angeles band Ellipses, and is a featured vocalist on TBS' The Detour with Jason Jones and Samantha Bee. Her song, "Annex", written by Rob Kolar and Jason Jones, is on TBS' The Detour Season One Soundtrack.

References

External links

Living people
1983 births
21st-century Argentine writers
Argentine expatriates in the United States
21st-century Argentine actresses
21st-century American writers
American women comedians
21st-century Argentine women writers
21st-century American women writers
21st-century American comedians